At My Window may mean:

At My Window (album), an album by Townes Van Zandt
"At My Window", a song by the Beach Boys from their album Sunflower